Wassim Y. Almawi is professor in the School of Pharmacy at Lebanese American University in Byblos, Lebanon, and adjunct professor at Faculty of Sciences, El Manar University in Tunis, Tunisia. This followed appointment as professor and chairman of Department of Biochemistry at Arabian Gulf University in Bahrain from 2000 to 2017. Almawi is also the Chief of the Special and Molecular Diagnostics Laboratory in Bahrain.

References

Living people
Dalhousie University alumni
Lebanese American University alumni
Academic staff of the American University of Beirut
Harvard Medical School people
Bahraini academics
Academic staff of the Arabian Gulf University
Year of birth missing (living people)